William Foushee Sr. (October 26, 1749 – August 21, 1824) was an American medical doctor, politician, and socialite. After serving with distinction as a surgeon in the American Revolution, he entered into local Virginia politics, notably serving as the first Mayor of Richmond. He went on to become a political, social, and commercial leader in Richmond for the next half century of his life.

Early life
Foushee was born to John Foushee and Winifred (Williams) Foushee on October 26, 1749, in Northumberland County, Virginia.

A third-generation Virginian, Foushee's paternal grandfather James immigrated from France.

Marriage and children
On March 6, 1775, Foushee married Elizabeth Isabella Harmondson in Northampton County, Virginia.

The couple had seven children:
William Jr.
John
Nancy
Margaret
Elizabeth
Charlotte
Isabella

Isabella went on to marry founder of the Richmond Enquirer, Thomas Ritchie.

Career

Physician
Foushee was highly regarded in the medical profession. He was a surgeon during the American Revolutionary War. He was at one time President of the Medical Society of Virginia. He was also a first mover in the newly discovered smallpox inoculation.

Mayor of Richmond

Later years and death

For the last sixteen years of his life, Foushee served in the capacity of Richmond's postmaster. He was appointed to that position on June 20, 1808, by President Jefferson.

On August 21, 1824, Foushee died in his home. His body is interred at Shockoe Hill Cemetery on Shockoe Hill in Richmond.

References

1749 births
1824 deaths
Alumni of the University of Edinburgh
American people of French descent
Mayors of Richmond, Virginia
Physicians in the American Revolution
People of Virginia in the American Revolution
People from Northumberland County, Virginia
18th-century American physicians
Virginia colonial people
Burials in Virginia
18th-century American politicians
19th-century American politicians